"Sorry (I Ran All the Way Home)" is a song written by Artie Zwirn and Harry Giosasi and produced and arranged by LeRoy Holmes.  The single was performed by New York-based doo-wop group The Impalas.  It reached #2 on the U.S. pop chart, behind both The Happy Organ by Dave "Baby" Cortez and Kansas City by Wilbert Harrison.  It also went to #14 on the U.S. R&B chart. Overseas, "Sorry (I Ran All the Way Home)" went to #28 on the UK Singles Chart in 1959.  The song was featured on The Impalas' 1959 album, Sorry (I Ran All the Way Home).

The song ranked #24 on Billboard's Year-End top 100 singles of 1959.

Other versions
Guy Darrell and The Midniters, as a single in 1964, but it did not chart.
Heinz, on his 1964 album, Tribute to Eddie.
The Royal Showband Waterford, as the B-side to their 1964 single "Huckle Buck".
Phil Orsi and The Little Kings, as a single in 1966, but it did not chart.

References

1959 songs
1959 singles
1964 singles
1966 singles
Doo-wop songs